Trinidad and Tobago competed at the 1988 Summer Paralympics in Seoul, South Korea. The delegation consisted of four competitors: one track and field athlete, one table tennis player, and two weightlifters.

Trinidad and Tobago has not returned to the Paralympic Games since that date.

Athletics

Table tennis

Weightlifting

See also 
 Trinidad and Tobago at the 1988 Summer Olympics

References

Nations at the 1988 Summer Paralympics
1988
Paralympics